Ex-Files (Chinese: 前任攻略) is a 2014 Chinese romantic comedy film. It was released on January 31, 2014. A sequel titled Ex-Files 2 was released on November 6, 2015.

Cast
Han Geng
Helen Yao
Lee Sang-yeob
Wang Likun
Ban Jiajia
Zhang Hanyu
Ryan Zheng

Reception
The film grossed .

References

External links

2014 films
2014 romantic comedy films
Chinese romantic comedy films